Lawrence Martyn (22 March 1934 – 7 August 1994) was a British film and television actor known for his comedy performances.

Martyn was born in London and was a  member of the Parachute Regiment. He was famous as store maintenance man "Mr. Mash" in the BBC comedy series Are You Being Served?, appearing in the first three series before being replaced by Arthur English. He was unable to continue in this role because he was committed to the television series Spring and Autumn with Jimmy Jewel. Other TV appearances included Dad's Army, On the Buses, Look - Mike Yarwood!, Rising Damp, The Detectives and Grange Hill. He also played alongside Frankie Howerd in two of his BBC shows, Up Pompeii! and Whoops Baghdad.

Career 
Martyn played the role of the spiv Private Walker in the radio version of Dad's Army after the death of James Beck in 1973. His film roles included Carry On at Your Convenience, where he had a small part as the promenade rifle-range owner, and Carry On Behind, where he played an inept electrician who helps wire up the public address system at the caravan site the film was set in.

Death 
Martyn died on 7 August 1994 at home in St Mary's Bay, Kent at age 60.

Filmography

 Idol on Parade (1959) - Teenager
 Too Young to Love (1960) - Minor Role (uncredited)
 Never Let Go (1960) - Len
 Deadline Midnight (1961, TV Series) - Billy Brewster
 Flame in the Streets (1961) - Second Corner Boy (uncredited)
 Partners in Crime (1961) - Pete Lake
 Never Back Losers (1961) - Clive Parker
 The Day the Earth Caught Fire (1961) - Man at Water Station (uncredited)
 The Damned (1962) - Teddy Boy (uncredited)
 On the Beat (1962) - Yob in Cafe (uncredited)
 Breath of Life (1963) - Tony
 The Great St Trinian's Train Robbery (1966) - Chips
 Up the Junction (1968) - Barrow Boy
 Up Pompeii! (1970, TV Series) - Verminus / Spurius / Gaoler
 Carry On at Your Convenience (1971) - Rifle Range Owner
 For the Love of Ada (1971, TV Series) - Brian
 Kindly Leave the Kerb (1971, TV Series)
 Upstairs, Downstairs (1972, TV Series) - The Electrician
 Are You Being Served? (1972-1975, TV Series) - Mr. Mash
 Spring and Autumn (1972-1976, TV Series) - Brian Reid / Joe Dickinson
 Elementary, My Dear Watson (1973)
 Whoops Baghdad (1973, TV Series) - Derti Dhoti
 On the Buses (1973, TV Series) - Fred
 Look - Mike Yarwood! (1974-1976, TV Series)
 Carry On Behind (1975) - Electrician
 Don Alfonso (1975, Music film by Mike Oldfield) - Don Alfonso
 A Sharp Intake of Breath (1980, TV Series) - Barry Penders
 Omen III: The Final Conflict (1981) - Orator
 Grange Hill (1981, TV Series) - Bus Conductor
 West End Tales (1981, TV Series) - Checkie
 Minder (1982, TV Series) - Smith
 Don't Wait Up (1983, TV Series) - Garage mechanic
 Slinger's Day (1986, TV Series) - 1st Man Customer
 High & Dry (1987, TV Series) - Electricity Board Inspector
 The Bill (1989-1993, TV Series) - Pub Landlord / Landlord / Greengrocer / Norman Harris (final appearance)
 The Detectives (1993, TV Series) - Stable Hand

References

External links
BBC Comedy Guide entry

1934 births
1994 deaths
English male film actors
English male television actors
British Parachute Regiment soldiers
Male actors from London
20th-century English male actors
British male comedy actors